Stephen Todd  is a lawyer and a Professor of Law at the University of Canterbury in Christchurch, New Zealand. In 2022 he was elected a Fellow of the Royal Society Te Apārangi. The society said "Stephen Todd is a highly influential scholar in private law. He is author or part-author of seven books (30 including successive editions) and author of 49 articles and of chapters in 21 books. His work is widely cited and has had exceptional impact in New Zealand courts and in higher courts overseas."

Todd also holds a fractional position as Professor of Common Law at the University of Nottingham, where he gives lectures generally on pure economic loss and birth torts (wrongful birth, wrongful fertilisation).

He is the general editor and principal author of The Law of Torts in New Zealand, and the joint author with two colleagues of The Law of Contract in New Zealand.

His specialisation is New Zealand's accident compensation scheme and its relationship with the common law.

Singing 
Todd is known by students to sing a number of songs about important torts cases during lectures, including Donoghue v Stevenson. The songs were originally written for the Canterbury University Law Students Society Law Revue. He is known to have a passion for singing, in particular opera. He has authored the book Leading Cases in Song and traditionally brings his lecture series to a culmination by reciting some of the more notable songs within his book.

References

External links
 Academic profile (University of Canterbury)
 Academic profile (University of Nottingham)

Year of birth missing (living people)
Living people
British legal scholars
New Zealand legal scholars
Academics of the University of Nottingham
Academic staff of the University of Canterbury
Fellows of the Royal Society of New Zealand